Imamverdi Hamidov – (born 1 January 1941), is a professor and doctor of philology and head of the Department of Azerbaijan Literature of the Ancient Ages.

Life 
Imamverdi Hamidov was born in Bala Kolatan in the Masalli district of the Azerbaijan Republic.

Career 
 1997–present : Head of the Department of Literature of the Ancient Period of Nizami Institute of Literature
 2017–present : Member of the Editorial Board of the "Metafizika" International Journal of Philosophy and Interdisciplinary Research (at the invitation of Aladdin Malikov)

Defense of the thesis 
 1970 – Thesis for the degree of candidate of philological sciences on the topic "Ibn Qutaiba Dinavari" specialty literature of the peoples of Asia and Africa
 2009 – Thesis for the degree of Doctor of Philology on the topic "Problems of studying the classics of Azerbaijan literature in Arab literature" in the specialties of Azerbaijan literature and World literature (Arab literature)

References 

1941 births
Living people
Azerbaijani philologists